Juan Ignacio González Brazeiro (born 5 November 1993) is a Uruguayan professional footballer who plays as a midfielder for Central Español.

Club career
González began with Danubio. He made the opening appearances of his senior career in November 2012, featuring in Uruguayan Primera División defeats to Central Español, River Plate and Bella Vista. In the following May, González netted his first goal during a draw in the return fixture with the aforementioned River Plate. He remained with the club for a total of seven seasons, scoring fifteen goals across one hundred and seventy-three matches; notably winning the 2013–14 title. He had a trial with Fluminense in August 2018. In January 2019, González was signed by Defensa y Justicia of the Argentine Primera División.

González didn't appear competitively for Defensa, departing eight months later to San Martín of Primera B Nacional. He made his debut in a 2–2 draw away to Chacarita Juniors on 17 September 2020, which was the first of six appearances for the club. In August 2020, González returned to Uruguayan football with Plaza Colonia. He featured seven times in the Primera División across the next month, prior to leaving to head to Spain with Segunda División B side Deportivo La Coruña on 18 September.

International career
In 2015, González was called up by the Uruguay U22s for the Pan American Games in Canada. He participated in all five matches of the tournament, with Uruguay defeating Mexico in the final.

Career statistics
.

Honours
Danubio
Uruguayan Primera División: 2013–14

Uruguay U22
Pan American Games: 2015

References

External links

1993 births
Living people
Uruguayan footballers
Uruguayan expatriate footballers
Footballers from Paysandú
Uruguay youth international footballers
Footballers at the 2015 Pan American Games
Pan American Games medalists in football
Pan American Games gold medalists for Uruguay
Medalists at the 2015 Pan American Games
Association football midfielders
Uruguayan Primera División players
Primera Nacional players
Segunda División B players
Danubio F.C. players
Defensa y Justicia footballers
San Martín de Tucumán footballers
Plaza Colonia players
Deportivo de La Coruña players
Apollon Larissa F.C. players
Central Español players
Uruguayan expatriate sportspeople in Argentina
Uruguayan expatriate sportspeople in Spain
Expatriate footballers in Argentina
Expatriate footballers in Spain